DS Crucis (HR 4876, HD 111613) is a variable star near the open cluster NGC 4755, which is also known as the Kappa Crucis Cluster or Jewel Box Cluster.  It is in the constellation Crux.

Location

DS Crucis is one of the brightest stars in the region of the NGC 4775 open cluster, better known as the Jewel Box Cluster, but its membership of the cluster is in doubt.  The cluster is part of the larger Centaurus OB1 association and lies about 8,500 light years away.

DS Crucis and NGC 4755 lie just to the south-east of β Crucis, the lefthand star of the famous Southern Cross.

Variability
DS Crucis is a variable star with an amplitude of about 0.05 magnitudes.  It was found to be variable from the photometry performed by the Hipparcos satellite.  The variability type is unclear but it is assumed to be an α Cygni variable.

Properties
DS Crucis is an A1 bright supergiant (luminosity class Ia), although it has also been classified as A2 Iabe.  It is nearly 80,000 times the luminosity of the sun, partly due to its higher temperature of 9,000 K, and partly to being over a hundred times larger than the sun.  The κ Crucis cluster has a calculated age of 11.2 million years, and DS Crucis an age of seven million years.

References

Crux (constellation)
111613
B-type supergiants
062732
4876
CD-59 4432
J12511794-6019473
Alpha Cygni variables
Crucis, DS